William Aloysius Griffin (November 20, 1885 – January 1, 1950) was an American prelate of the Roman Catholic Church. He served as bishop of the Diocese of Trenton in New Jersey from 1940 until his death in 1950.  He previously served as an auxiliary bishop of the Archdiocese of Newark in New Jersey from 1938 to 1940.

Biography

Early life 
William Griffin was born in Elizabeth, New Jersey, the eleventh of twelve children of John J. and Catherine (née Lyons) Griffin. One of his brothers, John J. Griffin, was city attorney of Elizabeth and a Democratic member of the New Jersey General Assembly. He received his early education at the parochial school of St. Patrick Parish in Elizabeth, and then attended St. Patrick High School, also in Elizabeth. Griffin then attended Seton Hall College in South Orange, New Jersey before studying for the priesthood at Immaculate Conception Seminary at Seton Hall.

Priesthood 
Griffin was ordained a priest for the Diocese of Newark on August 15, 1910. His first assignment was as principal of Bayley Hall, a grammar school attached to Seton Hall College. A member of the faculty at Seton Hall for fifteen years, Griffin taught Latin, Greek, and English in the preparatory school before becoming professor of philosophy and English in the college.

In December 1924, Griffin was appointed diocesan director of the Society for the Propagation of the Faith. He later became national treasurer of the same organization in 1935. From 1929 to 1938, he was pastor of St. Michael Parish in Jersey City, New Jerseu. He was named a papal chamberlain in 1930. Griffin also served as administrator of St. John and St. Augustine Parishes in Newark, and state chaplain of the Ancient Order of Hibernians and the Catholic Daughters of the Americas.

Auxiliary Bishop of Newark 
On February 26, 1938, Griffin was appointed auxiliary bishop of the Archdiocese of Newark and titular bishop of Sanavo by Pope Pius XI. He received his episcopal consecration on May 1, 1938, from Archbishop Thomas J. Walsh, with Bishops John A. Duffy and Moses E. Kiley serving as co-consecrators, at Sacred Heart Cathedral in Newark. As an auxiliary bishop, he served as rector of Immaculate Conception Seminary.

Bishop of Trenton
Following the promotion of Bishop Kiley to Archbishop of Milwaukee, Giffin was named bishop of the Diocese of Trenton on May 21, 1940, by Pope Pius XII. His installation took place at St. Mary's Cathedral in Trenton on July 23, 1940.

William Griffin died from a stroke at the home of his brother-in-law and sister in Elizabeth on January 2, 1950; he was age 64.

References

1885 births
1950 deaths
People from Elizabeth, New Jersey
Seton Hall University alumni
Catholics from New Jersey
20th-century Roman Catholic bishops in the United States
Roman Catholic bishops of Trenton